Böszörmény or Besermyan, also Izmaelita or Hysmaelita ("Isma'ilism") or Szerecsen ("Saracens"), is a name for the Muslims who lived in the Kingdom of Hungary in the 10–13th centuries. Some of the Böszörmény probably joined the federation of the seven Magyar tribes during the 9th century, and later smaller groups of Muslims arrived in the Carpathian Basin. They were engaged in trading but some of them were employed as mercenaries by the kings of Hungary. Their rights were gradually restricted from the 11th century on, and they were coerced to accept baptism following the establishment of the Christian Kingdom of Hungary. They "disappeared" (probably became Christian and/or converted later to Bektashism in Hungary  ) by the end of the 13th century.

Origins
Modern authors claim that several groups of Muslims migrated to the Carpathian Basin in the course of the 10th–12th centuries; therefore, the Muslims living in the Kingdom of Hungary were composed of various ethnic groups. Most of them must have arrived from Volga Bulgaria, but toponyms suggest that Muslim (káliz: khalyzians) people arrived also from Khwarezm; these latter (or part of them) may have formed one of the three tribes of the Kabars who joined the federation of the Magyar tribes in the 9th century.

The Arab historian and geographer al-Mas'ūdī recorded in the 10th century that the heads of the tribal confederation had welcomed Muslim merchants and the merchants could even convert some of the Magyars to Islam. Al-Bakrī also mentioned that the Magyars ransomed the Muslims who had been captured in the neighboring countries. In the 10th century, Ibrahim ibn Yaqub described the Muslim merchants who arrived in Prague from the territories of the Magyars and traded slaves and tin. The Gesta Hungarorum recorded that many Muslims arrived in the Carpathian Basin from Volga Bulgaria during the reign of Taksony, Grand Prince of the Magyars ( 955 – before 972) and they settled down there.
The work of the Muslim traveler, Abu Hamid al-Garnati, who spent three years in the kingdom (1150–1153), proves that the Muslims living in the Kingdom of Hungary were composed of two groups: the Khwarezmians and the Maghrebians (Böszörmény). He was entrusted by King Géza II of Hungary to recruit soldiers among the Maghrebians (Böszörmény) living east of the Carpathian Basin. The Byzantine historian John Kinnamos mentioned that káliz warriors were captured during the war between the kingdom and the Byzantine Empire in 1165 and the Emperor Manuel I Komnenos removed some of them to Byzantine territories and their descendants are the Karamanlides

Muslim territories in the Kingdom of Hungary
The Muslims settled down in several groups in the Carpathian Basin. Their largest communities lived in the southern parts of the Kingdom of Hungary in Syrmia and in region where the Drava joins the Danube. Other significant groups of Muslims lived in and around Pest (especially after the migration of Muslim Bulgar nobles Bila and Baks), in the Nyírség (around Hajdúböszörmény) and around Nitra. The Arab geographer Yaqut al-Hamawi mentioned that Muslims from the Kingdom of Hungary were studying in Aleppo in the beginning of the 13th century. The students arrived in Aleppo from a frontier region of the kingdom where the Muslims lived in 30 settlements.

The Muslims' life in the kingdom
Most of the Muslims in the Kingdom of Hungary were engaged in trading and they were rich enough to lease royal properties in the 13th century. Other Muslims were employed in the king's army and participated in wars against the Byzantine Empire. Yaqut al-Hamawi's work proves that the Muslim population spoke the Hungarian language by the beginning of the 13th century.

Royal decrees issued in the second half of the 11th century by the kings of Hungary persecuted the Muslims, requiring their conversion into Christianity. King Ladislaus I of Hungary commanded that converted Muslims who continued to follow Islam were to be removed from their original settlements. King Coloman of Hungary ordered that each Muslim settlement had to build a church, and he prohibited marriage between Muslims. Probably in the next century, the kings also prohibited the building of walls around Muslim settlements and today their descendants are the Gagauz people.

By the period of King Géza II (1141–1162), the káliz people could practise their faith only in secrecy. The "Maghrebian" soldiers followed Islam openly, but it was Abu Hamid al-Garnati who taught them several Islamic traditions. Upon his request, the king even permitted the "Maghrebians" to have concubines.

Muslims in the 13th century
The Golden Bull of King Andrew II prohibited the employment of Muslims as minters and tax collectors. The king, however, continued to employ them in his administration. On 3 March 1231, Pope Gregory IX requested the prelates of the kingdom to protest against this practise, and authorized them to use ecclesiastical penalties for this reason. In the same year, King Andrew had to confirm the provisions of the Golden Bull but he continued to employ Muslims. Therefore, on 25 February 1232, Archbishop Robert of Esztergom placed the Kingdom of Hungary under an interdict and excommunicated some high dignitaries of the king. Pope Gregory IX sent a legate to the kingdom who reached an agreement with King Andrew on 20 August 1233 in Bereg. Under the agreement, the Muslims and the Jews could not hold royal offices and they were obliged to wear distinctive cloths. However, the king did not fulfill all the provisions of the agreement and therefore he was excommunicated, although he was absolved soon. On 10 December 1239, Pope Gregory IX even authorized King Béla IV of Hungary to lease his revenues to non-Christians.

Nevertheless, following the Mongol invasion of the kingdom (1241–1242) references to the Muslims in the kingdom became scarce. In 1290, King Ladislaus IV of Hungary appointed a former Muslim, Mizse, to the office of the Palatine.

The Böszörmény denomination is preserved as a family name and in toponyms, such as Hajdúböszörmény and Berekböszörmény.

See also
Besermyan
Islam in Hungary
Ishmael

References

Sources
Benda, Kálmán (editor): Magyarország történeti kronológiája (The Historical Chronology of Hungary); Akadémiai Kiadó, 1981, Budapest; .
Kristó, Gyula: Nem magyar népek a középkori Magyarországon (Non-Hungarian Peoples in the Medieval Hungary); Lucidus Kiadó, 2003, Budapest; .
Kristó, Gyula (editor): Korai Magyar Történeti Lexikon - 9-14. század (Encyclopedia of the Early Hungarian History - 9-14th centuries); Akadémiai Kiadó, 1994, Budapest; .

External links
https://web.archive.org/web/20080201055304/http://www.magyariszlam.hu/eng/history.html
http://www.hajduporta.hu/english/index.php?id=page1300

Surnames
Medieval Hungary
Islam in Hungary
Medieval Islamic world
Ethnic groups in Hungary
Bektashi Order